The International Journal of Comparative Education and Development is a peer-reviewed academic journal. The journal is the official journal of the Comparative Education Society of Hong Kong. The journal focuses on topics related to comparative and international education. The journal is connected with the Education University of Hong Kong.

External links

Education journals
English-language journals
Emerald Group Publishing academic journals